Crossbones is an American action-adventure drama television series that aired on the NBC network from May 30 to August 2, 2014. The series is a fictionalization of the life of the pirate Edward "Blackbeard" Teach, who is still alive in 1729 (historically, he died in 1718). The show was created by Neil Cross, James V. Hart, and Amanda Welles. Crossbones is based on Colin Woodard's book The Republic of Pirates.

The show was originally supposed to be a part of NBC's midseason schedule, but it was later pushed to summer. The series premiered on May 30, 2014, at 10:00 pm EDT. On July 24, 2014, NBC announced that Crossbones had been canceled, and the final two episodes were removed from the schedule. However, both episodes were later aired on August 2, 2014.

Plot
In 1729, the island of Santa Compaña is home to pirates, thieves, and cutthroats all ruled by the feared pirate captain Edward "Blackbeard" Teach, who the British Empire believes is dead, but who in actuality is merely in hiding. Calling himself "Commodore", he now uses this island as his base of operations.

According to the first episode:
At its height, the British Empire was the most powerful force humanity had ever known. Fully  of the world's population lived and died under the British flag. Yet its true power was not on land but on the sea where they ruled with the most brutal and efficient military force that has ever been: the British Navy. But the oceans that this navy sought to control were vast, unknowable and full of terrible danger. And for all the Crown's might, its ships were often lost to starvation, to storm and tempest, and to pirates. So it was in 1712, the Crown offered a prince's fortune to whoever could create a device that would allow its navy to navigate this great emptiness with a precision never before known. With this device, the Empire would increase its dominion over the world. But without it, the ships of the Crown would continue to be easy prey, not only from the gods and monsters of legend, but from a monster far more brutal and far more real.

Cast

Main
 John Malkovich as Edward "Blackbeard" Teach
 Richard Coyle as Tom Lowe
 Claire Foy as Kate Balfour
 Yasmine Al Massri as Selima El Sharad
 David Hoflin as Charles Rider
 Chris Perfetti as Tim Fletch
 Tracy Ifeachor as Nenna Ajanlekoko

Recurring
 Peter Stebbings as	James Balfour
 Julian Sands as William Jagger
 Ezra Buzzington as Oswald Eisengrim
 Henry Hereford as Frederick Nightingale
 Lauren Shaw as The Woman in White/Antoinette
 Emilien De Falco as Alain Mersault
 Kevin Ryan as John Finnegan
 Natalie Blair as Rose Dryden
 Aimee Mullins as The Women in White/Antoinette
 Henry Hereford as The Wild Man
 Marisé Alvarez as Nelly
 Ricardo Hinoa as Anignatius Locke
 Francis Rosas as Governor Fernando de Portocarrero

Episodes

Production
The network announced the series in May 2012 with a straight-to-series commitment. Ten episodes were ordered, and production began in Puerto Rico on October 15, 2013. Hugh Laurie was in negotiations to be cast in the role of Blackbeard. However, the role later went to Malkovich.

Georgeville Television, which had been participating as a production company, dropped out of the project in 2013.

Reception
Crossbones has received mixed reviews among critics. On Rotten Tomatoes, the show holds a rating of 61%, based on 28 reviews, with the site's critical consensus reading, "John Malkovich's show-stealing performance keeps Crossbones partially afloat, but an overly serious tone and choppy editing make this a leaky vessel for his talents." On Metacritic, the show earned a score of 57 out of 100, based on 23 critics, indicating "mixed or average reviews".

According to The Wrap, "The show leans more closely to blood-and-guts intrigue of Starz's Black Sails than to Pirates of Caribbean merriment"; "NBC's Crossbones series drew [the critic] in with the prospect of John Malkovich as Blackbeard, and while he does indeed dig into the pirate role with relish, it's not enough to save the show. The period yarn begins with great verve Friday night, but stumbles over narrative gymnastics to keep key players plotting against each other."  According to Mary McNamara of Los Angeles Times, "Slipstreaming the more hyper-paced and R-rated Black Sails on Starz, Crossbones may have a similar conceit—pirates are people too!—but its narrative ambitions are a bit loftier, driven more by character than plot." McNamara notes "There's so much plot, in fact, that it more than occasionally overwhelms what is clearly the heart of creator Neil Cross' tale: the surprisingly hypnotic game of psychological cat and mouse played by Blackbeard and the man who has been sent to kill him. That would be Tom Lowe (Richard Coyle), super-agent of the Royal Navy who enters our story posing as a ship's doctor."

Home media
On September 2, 2014, Crossbones was released on DVD. It would also be released on Blu-ray.

References

External links

Official website for The Republic of Pirates

2010s American drama television series
2014 American television series debuts
2014 American television series endings
American adventure television series
Television series about pirates
English-language television shows
NBC original programming
Television series by Universal Television
Television shows set in Puerto Rico
Alternate history television series
Works by Neil Cross